Wayna Khunu Qullu or Wayna Khunuqullu (Aymara wayna young (man), bachelor, khunu snow, qullu mountain, "young snow mountain", Hispanicized spellings Huayna Cuno Collo, Huaynacunocollo, Huayna Cuno Kollo) is one of the highest peaks in the Kimsa Cruz mountain range in the Andes of Bolivia.

Wayna Khunu Qullu is located in the La Paz Department, on the border of the Inquisivi Province and the Loayza Province, south-east of Jach'a Khunu Qullu, the highest elevation in this mountain range.

See also
List of mountains in the Andes

References 

Mountains of La Paz Department (Bolivia)